Yushu Tibetan Autonomous Prefecture (retranscribed into Tibetan as ), also transliterated as Yüxü or Yulshul, is an autonomous prefecture of Southwestern Qinghai Province, China. The official source of the Yellow River lies within the prefecture. Historically, the area belongs to the cultural realm of Kham in Eastern Tibet.

On 14 April 2010, an earthquake struck the prefecture, registering a magnitude of 6.9 (USGS, EMSC) or 7.1 (Xinhua). It originated in the Yushu Tibetan Autonomous Prefecture, at  local time.

History and traditional culture

Monasticism

Yushu prefecture is rich in Tibetan Buddhist monasteries. Being a constituent of the former Nangchen kingdom, the area was, for most of the time, not under domination by the Dalai Lama’s Gelugpa order in Lhasa. The different balance of power in this part of Kham enabled the older Tibetan Buddhist orders to prevail in Yushu.  Of the 195 pre-1958 lamaseries only 23 belonged to the Gelugpa.

An overwhelming majority of more than 100 monasteries followed and still follow the teachings of the various Kagyupa schools, with some of their sub-sects only found in this part of Tibet. The Sakyapa were and are also strong in Yushu, with many of their 32 monasteries being among the most significant in Kham. The Nyingmapa’s monastic institutions amount to about the same number, while the Bönpo are only met with in one lamasery they share with the Nyingmapa.

Prior to collectivization in 1958, the entire monastic population of present-day Yushu TAP amounted to more than 25,000 Buddhist monks and nuns, with approximately 300 incarnate lamas among them. On the average about three to five per cent of the population were monastic, with a strikingly higher share in Nangchen county, where monks and nuns made up between 12 and 20% of the community.

Geography

Yushu Prefecture occupies most of the southwestern third of Qinghai, with the exception of the province's extreme southwestern corner (Tanggulashan Town), which is an exclave of the Haixi Mongol and Tibetan Autonomous Prefecture. A significant portion of the prefecture's territory is incorporated into the Sanjiangyuan National Nature Reserve, intended to protect the headwaters of the three great rivers.

Most of the prefecture's population lives in its southeastern part: primarily in the valley of the upper Yangtze (whose section within the prefecture is known in Chinese as the  Tongtian River, in Tibetan as Drichu ), and some also in the valley of the Mekong (the Dzachu  River). The highlands away from these two rivers, as well as the western part of the prefecture, have very little population.

Climate
With elevations above , the prefecture has a harsh climate, with long, cold winters, and short, rainy, and cool to warm summers. Specifically, in the Köppen system, the prefecture ranges from the alpine variation of the subarctic climate (Köppen Dwc), to a full alpine climate (Köppen EH), to a semi-arid climate (Köppen BSk). Most of the annual precipitation occurs from June to September, when on average, a majority of the days each month has some rainfall. Sunshine is generous, ranging from around 2500 hours in the prefecture seat to 2780 hours in Qumarlêb.

Subdivisions
The prefecture is subdivided into six county-level divisions, composing 5 counties and 1 County-level city:

Economy
Agricultural produce of Yushu includes trees, wheat and millet including black Highland barley.

Transportation
The eastern part of the prefecture, where most of its population lives,  is served by the China National Highway 214 and the recently constructed (opened 2009) Yushu Batang Airport. In 2017 the G0613 Xining–Lijiang Expressway was completed, connecting the region to Hainan Tibetan Autonomous Prefecture and Xining.

The far western part of the prefecture, which is hundreds of kilometers away from the prefecture's eastern "core", and has very little population, is crossed by  China National Highway 109 and the Qinghai-Tibet Railway.

Population

Ethnic groups in Yushu, according to 2005 Yushu Statistical Yearbook:

This statistics only includes the registered population, not the floating population which is estimated at 50–60,000 for the entire prefecture.

References 
 Citations

External links 

 Yushu: A Tibetan Town Rebuilt in Beijing's Image
 The East Tibet Website
 Nangchen historic area
 Yushu Tibet Autonomous Prefecture
 Official Website of the Yushu Tibet Autonomous Prefecture

 
Prefecture-level divisions of Qinghai
Tibetan autonomous prefectures
Tibetan people
Amdo